London Executive Aviation is an air charter airline based at Stapleford Aerodrome near Romford, United Kingdom. It operates ad-hoc private jet charters and offers aircraft management services worldwide. Its current Chief Executive is Patrick Margretson-Rushmore 

London Executive Aviation Ltd holds a CAA Type B Operating Licence permitting carriage of passengers, cargo and mail on aircraft with fewer than 20 seats and/or weighing less than 10 tonnes.

Fleet

The London Executive Aviation fleet includes:

 7 Embraer Legacy 600 (as of August 2016)
 2 Embraer Legacy 650 (as of August 2016)
 1 Dassault Falcon 2000
 2 Bombardier Challenger 300
 6 Cessna Citation Excel
 1 Embraer Phenom 300
 2 Cessna Citation II

London Executive Aviation introduced the four-passenger Cessna Citation Mustang into the UK charter market and placed Cessna's largest European order for the aircraft. Their fleet comprises a variety of different business jets for different tasks.

One of the Bombardier Challenger 300 owned by LEA is based at London Luton Airport.

References

External links

Airlines of the United Kingdom
Airlines established in 1995